Pectinimura batubatuensis is a moth in the family Lecithoceridae. It is found on the Philippines (Batu Batu).

The wingspan is 15–16 mm. The forewings and hindwings are dark brown.

Etymology
The species name is derived from Batu Batu, the type locality.

References

Moths described in 2008
batubatuensis